The 4th Princess Louise Dragoon Guards is an inactive armoured regiment of the Canadian Militia / Canadian Army. It is currently on the Supplementary Order of Battle.

Lineage

Several independent troops of cavalry in the Province of Canada's volunteer militia were formed in the Kingston area starting in 1855. Four of these troops (in Kingston, Napanee, Loughborough and Picton) were united under a regimental headquarters in 1875, becoming the 4th Provisional Regiment of Cavalry. This regiment adopted hussar uniforms (with buff facings) and hussar customs in 1893, being Redesignated as the 4th Hussars. In 1932, they were again Redesignated as the 4th Hussars of Canada.

Meanwhile, in Ottawa, the city's independent cavalry troop (formed in 1872) came under the patronage of the Princess Louise, Marchioness of Lorne, during her time there as vice-regal consort (1878–80), and the troop was expanded to an independent squadron named The Princess Louise Dragoon Guards. During the Second Boer War, volunteers from the squadron fought with the Imperial forces in South Africa. The squadron was again expanded into a regiment in 1903 as the 5th "Princess Louise Dragoon Guards".

The 4th Hussars and the 5th PLDG were not mobilized in the First World War, but they both contributed volunteers to and aided in the recruiting of the 8th Regiment, Canadian Mounted Rifles. The 8th CMR did not enter combat as a unit, its personnel being absorbed by the reserves in England and the 4th Battalion, Canadian Mounted Rifles, in France, but enough of its former members fought at the Battle of Mount Sorrel that the regiment qualified for a battle honour, which the PLDG perpetuates.

In the 1936 reorganization of the Militia, the PLDG and the 4th Hussars were amalgamated as the 4th Princess Louise Dragoon Guards.

4th Princess Louise Dragoon Guards 

 Originated on 1 January 1903, in Ottawa, Ontario, as the Princess Louise Dragoon Guards.
 Redesignated on 1 February 1903, as the 5th Princess Louise Dragoon Guards.
 Redesignated on 15 March 1920, as The Princess Louise Dragoon Guards.
 Amalgamated on 15 December 1936, with the 4th Hussars of Canada and Redesignated as the 4th Princess Louise Dragoon Guards.
 Redesignated on 11 February 1941, as the 2nd (Reserve) Regiment, 4th Princess Louise Dragoon Guards.
 Redesignated on 1 April 1941, as the 4th (Reserve) Reconnaissance Battalion, (4th Princess Louise Dragoon Guards).
 Redesignated on 8 June 1942, as the 4th (Reserve) Reconnaissance Regiment (4th Princess Louise Dragoon Guards), CAC.
 Redesignated on 2 August 1945, as the 4th (Reserve) Reconnaissance Regiment (4th Princess Louise Dragoon Guards), RCAC.
 Redesignated on 19 June 1947, as the 4th Armoured Car Regiment (4th Princess Louise Dragoon Guards), RCAC.
 Redesignated on 4 February 1949, as the 4th Princess Louise Dragoon Guards (4th Armoured Car Regiment).
 Redesignated on 19 May 1958, as the 4th Princess Louise Dragoon Guards.
 Reduced to Nil Strength on 12 February 1965, and transferred to the Supplementary Order of Battle.

4th Hussars of Canada 

 Originated on 30 April 1875, in Kingston, Ontario, as the 4th Provisional Regiment of Cavalry.
 Redesignated on 7 May 1886, as the 4th Regiment of Cavalry.
 Redesignated on 1 January 1893, as the 4th Hussars.
 Redesignated on 1 March 1932, as the 4th Hussars of Canada.
 Amalgamated on 15 December 1936, with The Princess Louise Dragoon Guards and Redesignated as the 4th Princess Louise Dragoon Guards.

Lineage Chart 

|-
|style="text-align: left;"| class="wikitable"
+ Abbreviations used in the chart
-
 Abbreviation  Phrase
-
 Armd  Armoured
-
 Bn  Battalion
-
 CAC  Canadian Armoured Corps
-
 CASF  Canadian Active Service Force
-
Cav.  Cavalry
-
 CEF  Canadian Expeditionary Force
-
 CIC  Canadian Infantry Corps
-
 RCAC  Royal Canadian Armoured Corps
-
 Recce  Reconnaissance
-
 Regt  Regiment

Perpetuations 

 8th Regiment, Canadian Mounted Rifles

History

Prewar
In 1936 the 4th Hussars of Canada and The Princess Louise Dragoon Guards were amalgamated to form the 4th Princess Louise Dragoon Guards.

Second World War
The 4th Princess Louise Dragoon Guards was a Militia regiment activated for wartime service with the Canadian Army (Active) in 1941. It was assigned to the Royal Canadian Armoured Corps which itself had been activated in 1940. In 1942 it was redesignated the 4th Reconnaissance Regiment (4th Princess Louise Dragoon Guards), the same year the first of its soldiers sailed for the United Kingdom where 4th PLDG joined 1st Canadian Infantry Division at Camp Aldershot.

4th Recce immediately began expanding its ranks, taking volunteers from infantry regiments serving in the United Kingdom and a steady flow of reinforcements from Canada. Four squadrons were eventually raised in addition to the Regimental HQ Squadron. A reserve squadron, based in Ottawa continued to provide reinforcements throughout the war as well.

"A" Squadron of 4th PLDG landed in Sicily on July 13, 1943, as part of the Follow Up Forces. Only "A" Squadron, commanded by Major Arthur Duck actually took part in the Sicily fighting. B and C Squadrons were not fully equipped with the requisite number of "Otter" Light, and "Fox" Heavy Reconnaissance Cars and Universal Carriers until October, when the regiment was serving on the Italian mainland. D Squadron was raised that winter when heavy rains and freezing temperatures rendered the Princess Louise Dragoon Guards' vehicles all but useless and the personnel from the latter squadron patrolled their sector on horseback instead.

4th PLDG took part in virtually all of the major actions in the campaign, which lasted just 38 days. The regiment landed at Reggio di Calabria, on the Italian mainland on September 3, 1943, on the heels of 3rd Canadian Infantry Brigade and immediately began providing 1st Canadian Infantry Division Headquarters with information with regard to the ground to the north including the condition of roads and bridges and the location and strength of enemy forces. Each of the squadrons was composed of three scout troops and assault troop, equipped with a combination of Otter Light Reconnaissance Cars and Fox Heavy Reconnaissance Cars. The Fox had a revolving turret fitted with a .50 calibre Browning machine gun as well as a Bren. 303 calibre light machine gun. The Otter mounted a single Bren as did the Universal Carriers used to transport the Scout and Assault Troops.

When a reporter asked the Officer Commanding, C-Squadron, Major Harold Parker as to what he and his men did in Italy he replied: "We keep driving until the enemy shoots at us. Then we know he is there".  Parker was doing just that when his armoured car was struck by a 75mm shell on the Torella-Duronia road. The major was killed and his crew badly wounded. The scouts, frequently operated well behind enemy lines: During the Hitler Line battles in May 1944 during which 4th PLDG's War Diarist noted, proudly that it was "the first unit in 8th Army" to penetrate the latter fortifications at Pontecorvo Sergeant Hubert Ditner, a farmer from Petersburg, Ontario, and his men took the opportunity to catch a few hours sleep in a roadside ditch where he awoke to find that he and his comrades were just yards from a fighting hole filled with grenadiers from 44th Reichsgrenadier "Hoch und Deutschmeister" Division. Ditner, who spoke fluent German managed to get all ten to surrender without firing a shot.  In a letter to his younger brother, Simon Sgt. Ditner confessed that he "didn't know who was shaking more, Jerry or me."

One of the most notable engagements fought by 4th PLDG took place at Miglionico. Numbers 4 and 8 (Assault) Troops, under Lieutenant Don White used a rail tunnel to infiltrate the rear area of positions held by Oberst Ludwig Heilmann's 3rd Fallschirmjager Regiment and launch the attack that killed an estimated 50 paratroopers and destroyed several trucks, an armoured car and a large quantity of ammunition.

All three squadrons were active on the Italian mainland by the time the regiment was transferred to the Infantry Corps. The regiment was assigned to 12th Canadian Infantry Brigade of the recently arrived 5th Canadian Armoured Division on July 13, 1944. The decision was the result of 8th Army commander General Montgomery's concern that the division lacked the sufficient number of infantry battalions to protect the division's tanks against attacks by enemy infantry armed with shoulder fired anti-tank weapons and self-propelled guns. The regiment, having established a reputation for courage and tenacity while operating as scouts, soon distinguished itself in its new role. It was ordered to take Monte Peloso on September 1, 1944, also known as Point 253. The hill, part of the enemy's Gothic Line was targeted by 1st Division's gunners for the better part of an hour before C-Squadron began closing on the position at 13:10. As the Princess Louise began climbing it they ran headlong into paratroopers from 3rd Fallschirmjager Regiment, preparing to mount a counterattack on nearby Point 204 and there was a furious, close-quarters gun battle prior to Lord Strathcona's Horse joining 4th PLDG in the assault on the main German defences, a handful of farm buildings midway up the slope. The Shermans blasted the startled paratroopers from the buildings and the waiting Princess Louise cut them down with small arms fire. By last light Point 253 was in Canadian hands. The first battle as infantry had cost the regiment dearly, however: 35 men were dead and another 94 wounded.

A message penned by 8th Army's commander, General Leese, congratulated the Princess Louise for their victory, made that much more remarkable based on the unit's very brief training as infantry.

On a humorous note, members of the unit were once urged by General Simonds (GOC 1st Canadian Infantry Division) to beat a U.S. Army unit into the Sicilian village of Enna and thus take credit for its capture. A mixed bag of NCO's and troopers mounted their armoured cars and headed for the town only to be halted by a demolished culvert. Not to be denied, the soldiers commandeered a mule and continued the race arriving in the village just as troops from 1st Infantry Division did so. Though the weary Canadians were only too happy to clamber aboard one of the latter unit's jeeps and ride the rest of the way into town, the regimental history of the 4th Princess Louise Dragoon Guards maintains that Corporal Jackson was first to dismount in Enna's piazza rendering the Canadian Army as the rightful liberators of the town.

The regiment was returned to its reconnaissance role, and Armoured Corps status on 15 March 1945 and finished the war in Rotterdam, the Netherlands, after being transferred to the theatre as part of Operation Goldflake. Fighting in a number of engagements with the heavily armoured German divisions as they fled, a role the unit had performed with some distinction in Italy, 4th PLDG suffered heavy losses. Battlefield deaths, all ranks, for the entire year of 1944 were 150. In the four months 4th Recce fought in North West Europe, a third of the time it was in Italy, it lost some 187 men (4th PLDG History Page 306).

Postwar
The 4th Princess Louise Dragoon Guards was moved to the Supplementary Order of Battle of the Canadian Army in 1965.

Organization

4th Princess Louise Dragoon Guards (15 December 1936) 

 Regimental Headquarters (Ottawa, Ontario)
 A Squadron (Ottawa, Ontario)
 B Squadron (Ottawa, Ontario)
 C Squadron (Prescott, Ontario)

Alliances 

  - 4th Queen's Own Hussars (1936-1958)
  - The Queen's Royal Irish Hussars (1958-1965)
  - 10th Royal Hussars (Prince of Wales's Own) (1936-1965)

Uniform and Traditions 
Since the 1870s, the Princess Louise Dragoon Guards wore a full-dress uniform similar to that of the Carabiniers (6th Dragoon Guards). This consisted of a dark blue dragoon tunic with white collar and cuffs, facings and piping, and dark blue trousers with white double stripes. The regimental headdress consisted of a brass cavalry helmet with a white horsehair plume. Their undress dark blue peaked cap had a scarlet band and piping, which was a unique distinction granted to this regiment.

Though transferred to the infantry in July 1944, 4th PLDG retained the black beret of the Canadian Armoured Corps and continued to refer to its sub-units as "squadrons" and "troops" instead of "companies" and "platoons", the traditional infantry designation.

Battle honours

In the list below, battle honours in small capitals were awarded for participation in large operations and campaigns, while those in lowercase indicate honours granted for more specific battles. The battle honours in bold type are emblazoned on the regimental standard.

Notable soldiers
"Herbie" the cartoon soldier that appeared in the Canadian Army's newspaper, The Maple Leaf, was the brainchild of Sergeant William Garnet "Bing" Coughlin of 4th PLDG.
Major-General Harry Wickwire Foster (Harold Wickwire Foster), commander of both 4th Canadian Armoured Division (North West Europe) and 1st Canadian Infantry Division (Italy). In 1941, (then) Lieutenant-Colonel Foster assumed command of 4th Reconnaissance Regiment - 4th Princess Louise Dragoon Guards, the recently activated scout formation assigned to 1st Canadian Infantry Division in England.
Major-General Clive Addy joined the regiment as a reserve Trooper in the early 1960s.
Trooper Lorne W. R. Mulloy served in the regiment in 1899 before joining the Royal Canadian Dragoons for service in South Africa where he was awarded the DCM.

Notes

External links
 Royal Canadian Armoured Corps Association webpage

4th Princess Louise Dragoon Guards
Dragoon regiments of Canada
Military units and formations of Ontario
Organizations based in Ottawa
Armoured regiments & units of Canada in World War II
Military units and formations disestablished in 1965
Supplementary Order of Battle